C94 may refer to :
 Ruy Lopez, Breyer Variation chess openings ECO code
 Other leukaemias of specified cell type ICD-10 code
 Labour Clauses (Public Contracts) Convention, 1949 code
 Earlville Airport in Earlville, Illinois FAA LID